Kundu River  basin or catchment area is called Renadu i.e., River Kundu flowing area is called is Renadu.

Kundu River starts at Uppalapadu Village of Orvakal Mandal in nandyal District. It flows through Orvakal, Gadivemula, Nandyal, Koilkuntla, Uyyalawada, areas of Nandyal district and Jammalamadugu, Proddatur areas of  Kadapa district and merge with Penna River near Kamalapuram, Kadapa District.

The heart of Renadu is an area containing the lands of  Nossam, Uyyalawada, Koilkuntla, Owk, Jammalamadugu, and Proddatur which now form part of the Nandyal district and Kadapa district in the Indian state of Andhra Pradesh.

References 

Sub regions of Andhra Pradesh
Rayalaseema
Geography of Kadapa district